Jessica Lynn Sutta (born May 15, 1982), previously known as J Sutta, is an American singer, dancer, and actress. She is best known as a former member of the American girl group the Pussycat Dolls.

Born and raised in Miami, Florida, Sutta developed an interest in dance from a young age and went on to become a one-time captain squad Miami Heat's cheerleading squad. After venturing into acting, Sutta then moved to Los Angeles in 2003 and began dancing alongside the burlesque troupe, the Pussycat Dolls. Sutta was included in the group's transition into a recording act and released the albums PCD (2005) and Doll Domination (2008), earning Sutta a Grammy Award nomination and becoming one of the world's best-selling girl groups of all time. Sutta's debut single, "Show Me", reached number one on the Billboard Dance Club Songs chart in the United States. Her debut solo studio album, I Say Yes, was released on March 3, 2017.

In November 2019, it was announced Sutta had rejoined the Pussycat Dolls and would join them on their 2020 reunion tour, titled The Pussycat Dolls Tour. They released their comeback single, "React", on February 7, 2020.

Early life 
Jessica Lynn Sutta was born in Miami, Florida to a Catholic and Jewish family of Irish, Russian, and Polish descent. At the age of three, she was enrolled in various dance classes and would later attend Miami City Ballet and the New World School of the Arts at the age of 14 to further her dance skills. When she was 17, Sutta tore her ACL on both knees and switched to theatre, thinking her dance career was over. Sutta perceived that as career setback, as her goal was to travel to New York City and become a ballerina but viewed it as an opportunity to "[begin] her journey into different forms of art." Eventually, through rehabilitation Sutta's knees healed and joined NBA's cheerleading squad Miami Heat in 1999, becoming the captain in 2001. During this period she ventured into acting; she had a minor role in the film Bully (2001), directed by Larry Clark, and the following year, she was cast as a series regular on Ocean Ave., in which she played Jody, a "pill-popping, out-of-control teenager" of an elite family living in Miami.

Career

2003–2009: The Pussycat Dolls 

In 2003, Sutta moved to Los Angeles, and landed a PSA job as a dancer for Smokey Bear and met choreographer and the Pussycat Dolls creator, Robin Antin. Antin took a likening to Sutta and invited her to be part of the burlesque troupe. She began performing with the Dolls towards the end of the burlesque act at The Viper Room. During this time, Antin struck a joint venture with Interscope Geffen A&M Records's Jimmy Iovine to develop the Pussycat Dolls into a brand and create a separate recording group. After a series of changes, the final line-up consisted of Sutta, Carmit Bachar, Ashley Roberts, Nicole Scherzinger, Melody Thornton, and Kimberly Wyatt. April 2005 saw the release of their debut single, "Don't Cha", which topped the charts in 15 countries and peaked at number two on the US Billboard Hot 100. Their debut album, PCD, was released in September 2005 to commercial success, selling nearly three million copies in the United States and exceeding seven million copies worldwide as of September 2008. PCD's following singles, "Stickwitu, "Beep", and "Buttons" topped the charts in New Zealand, becoming the most successful new act in local chart history. The foremost, earned Sutta a nomination for Best Pop Performance by a Duo or Group with Vocals at the 49th Annual Grammy Awards (2007). Sutta's first projects outside the group were features on Dave Audé's "'Make It Last" and Paul van Dyk's "White Lies", which were released in 2007. Both songs reached number one on the US Hot Dance Club Play chart, making Sutta the first member to have a number-one single as a solo artist in the US, and one of the few artists to have two concurrent top-ten singles. The latter song was also a moderate success in Europe.

Bachar's departure preceded the release of their second studio album, Doll Domination. Released in September 2008, the album attained their highest peak position on the US Billboard 200, but it is considered a commercial disappointment selling less than 400,000 copies in the US. Doll Domination included the singles "When I Grow Up" and "I Hate This Part", which reached the top twenty on the US Billboard Hot 100 chart. In January 2009, the group embarked on the Doll Domination Tour, their second headlining concert tour, which highlighted stops in Europe, Oceania and Asia, and grossed over $14 million. In the meantime, tensions erupted within the group as Sutta and other members where dissatisfied with the label's decision to credit Scherzinger as featured artist on "Jai Ho! (You Are My Destiny)". The singer later suffered a back injury during the first Sydney show, leaving the group performing as a foursome throughout the following dates. The injury and Scherzinger's over-emphasis as the lead singer where factors in Sutta's exit from the group. Sutta explained that living in "the shadow of [Scherzinger] [...] wasn't a joyful experience" adding that her broken rib "sent [her] over the edge" and influenced her decision to leave the group.

As of February 2020, The Pussycat Dolls have sold more than 15 million albums and 40 million singles worldwide, becoming one of the world's best-selling girl groups of all time.

2010–2018: Solo career development, Feline Resurrection, and I Say Yes

On September 19, 2010, she released her first solo single, "I Wanna Be Bad", which she wrote and produced with Tearce Keaz. On September 24, 2010, she debuted the song at the West Hollywood Gay bar, Here Lounge. On October 18, 2010, the music video for the single directed by Frank E. Flowers, premiered on Radar Online. On December 26, 2010, she debuted and performed two new tracks titled, "Good Boy" and "Jack in the Box", at the Dolphins vs. Lions Game at Sun Life Stadium in Miami, Florida.
On March 3, 2011, she revealed a collaboration with DJ Erick Morillo on a track titled "Pin-up Girl". The song was written by VASSY & Jamie Hartman, and produced by Morillo, Harry Romero and José Nunez. It also features American rapper Stone Wallace. On March 27, 2011, she performed the track alongside Wallace and Morillo at Ultra Music Festival.

Cedric Gervais' "Where Ever U Are", which features Sutta, was released on August 2, 2011 and appears on Gervais' album Miamication. On June 3, 2011, she announced on Twitter that she had signed to "Hollywood Records", home to several Disney artists. Sutta's first single "Show Me" premiered on Idolator on August 3, 2011. The video premiered on Saturday, August 6 on ABC Family. Following that, the song became available digitally on August 23. The song peaked at number one on the Hot Dance Club Songs in the United States, becoming Sutta's first number-one single as a solo artist. She then began working on her debut solo album, Sutta Pop, which remains unreleased.

In 2012, she performed at various corporate and other performance venues, achieving critical acclaim for her performance at Chicago's Halsted Market Days. In June 2012, Sutta revealed to The Morning Show that she was working with RedOne on her upcoming album. On August 5, 2012, Sutta announced that she was planning to release, "Make It Loud", as her second single in September of the same year. However, the single was not released. On October 6, 2012, Sutta revealed on Ustream that she was no longer working with RedOne and had left Hollywood Records. On December 13, 2012, Sutta revealed that she would be releasing new music in early 2013.

In February 2013, Sutta announced the release of her new single called "Again" in March. It was released on March 26 via Citrusonic Stereophonic. "Again" peaked at number 4 on the Hot Dance Club Songs in the United States. The song received fan and media praise, while Billboard Magazine called "Again" an intriguing next step. The song's extended version and remixes were released on May 28. The third promotional single "Lights Out" was released via Citrusonic Stereophoic on August 20, with a bright, glow in the dark lyric video. The song's remixes were released on November 1. It later peaked at number 3 on the Hot Dance Club Songs in United States.

Sutta continued to put various singles out and stay active throughout 2014–2015 and reached the top of the Hot Dance Charts once again as a featured artist on Dave Aude's cover of "Gonna Get U".
In February 2016 she released what has arguably been her most successful mainstream single yet titled "Forever"
The song received radio play nationally and Sutta was the No. 1 Independent artist for 4 weeks straight on the Top 40 Radio Chart peaking at No. 56 and No. 57 on Rhythmic. In the same year Sutta released her album Feline Resurrection, composed of discards from her first official album I Say Yes, via Premier League Music. She released one new song from the mixtape for free download every Friday from April 8 to June 9, 2016, starting with the first track "I Tried" with a total of 17 tracks.

"Forever" premiered on more than 15 media outlets internationally including Bustle, Idolator, Galore, EDM Sauce, Fox News Magazine, Perez Hilton, EDM Tunes and more. The single was also featured on Spotify's 'Weekend Buzz' playlist and iTunes 'Top Track This Week' in Pop. The single's video was released exclusively on VEVO's homepage on March 21, 2016 and reached 1.17 million views within the first two weeks. The "Forever" remix features rapper Meek Mill on her forthcoming solo album I Say Yes which debuted on March 3, 2017.

2019–present: The Pussycat Dolls reunion 

On November 29, 2019, after months of speculation for a possible Pussycat Dolls reunion, Sutta along with Bachar, Roberts, Scherzinger, and Wyatt confirmed their reunion on Heart radio where they also announced a tour originally scheduled for 2020. A live performance on the finale of The X Factor: Celebrity followed, which included a medley of previous singles and their new song, "React". British media regulator Ofcom received over 400 complaints from viewers who criticized the band's perceived provocative nature of their performance.

"React" was released in February 2020 to moderate success. The Pussycat Dolls are committed on embarking their reunion tour, which was postponed until September 2022 due to the COVID-19 pandemic.

Media appearances
Sutta plays the woman who was abused by her husband in Ana Johnsson's music video for "Don't Cry for Pain". As a freelance dancer, she appeared in music videos for Will Smith ("Miami"), Baby Bash ("Suga Suga"), Craig David ("Spanish") and Gloria Estefan ("Don't Let This Moment End"), among others.

As an actress, she was part of the original cast in the Swedish American soap opera known as Ocean Ave., alongside Megan Fox, where she played Jody Starr, a pill-poppin' Gothic teenager. She has also appeared in the movie From Justin to Kelly, a 2003 American romantic comedy musical film, and Bully where she played Blonde. Sutta had a brief role in the 2003 film Bad Boys II. She was also hosting a show for a Miami-based cable network called "SoBe in the Night". In 2007, she appeared on an episode of the game show Identity in disguise as a Pussycat Doll.

In 2007, Sutta appeared in a series of video ads on MySpace for Unilever's Axe body spray, as part of their 'Bom Chicka Wah Wah' campaign. The ads took the form of instructional dance videos, with Sutta displaying 'sexy' dance moves. In 2010, Sutta appeared in FHM Magazine's "100 Sexiest Women in the World", ranking at No. 71. Sutta is a supporter of gay rights. In December 2010, she appeared in a YouTube video by the LGBT for-profit company FCKH8, and a play on the NOH8 Campaign, of which she also shot a photo for.

In 2011, Sutta appeared in Capra's music video for their new song "If I Was". Sutta also guest featured in "HAHA,JK!", an online hidden-camera show, in a webisode titled "The Assistant", that stars Comedian Jamie Kennedy. Sutta was a guest judge on the sixth episode in the 19th cycle of America's Next Top Model.

In 2016, Sutta headlined the second annual Babes for Boobs bachelor auction benefitting Susan G. Komen L.A. alongside hosts Kelly Osbourne, The Insider's Michael Yo and Dancing with the Stars' Kym Johnson. She also headlined the Main Stage at San Francisco Pride and paid tribute to the victims and families of the Orlando nightclub shooting.

Personal life  

At the height of the Pussycat Dolls popularity, Sutta was struggling with alcoholism. In 2017 she remarked that it would have destroyed her life. "I didn't realize how destructive alcohol was. I was confused and broken, and it was like I had to kill that part of me and be reborn." She has abstained from alcohol since 2016 after entering a Beach House Rehab Center in Miami, Florida. There she met drummer Mikey Marquart and became engaged in December 2018. They got married on September 14, 2019 in Malibu. In May 2021, Sutta gave birth to a boy. As of November 2021, they reside in Monte Nido, California.. On March, 2023 she mentioned on an interview having a “severe reaction” that she attributed to the Moderna COVID-19 vaccinations.

Discography
 
 I Say Yes (2017)

Filmography

Film

Television

Awards and nominations

References

Notes

External links

 
 
 Jessica's YouTube channel

1982 births
Living people
21st-century American singers
21st-century American women singers
American cheerleaders
American dance musicians
American female dancers
American women pop singers
American people of Irish descent
American people of Russian-Jewish descent
American people of Polish-Jewish descent
American people of Romanian-Jewish descent
Dancers from Florida
Hollywood Records artists
Musicians from Miami
National Basketball Association cheerleaders
Participants in American reality television series
People from Cutler Bay, Florida
Singers from Florida
The Pussycat Dolls members